Balu Anand (1954 – 3 June 2016) was an Indian actor and director who worked in Tamil-language films (Kollywood). He appeared in over 100 films as an actor and directed several films, such as Naane Raja Naane Mandhiri, Annanagar Mudhal Theru and Unakkaga Piranthen.

Career

Anand is known as the director of successful films Naane Raja Naane Mandhiri starring Vijayakanth and the Sathyaraj, Radha, Ambika starrer Annanagar Mudhal Theru, a remake of Malayalam film Gandhinagar 2nd Street.

In the early 2000s, Anand attempted to make a comeback through two films as a director, Paapoo...Paapoo and Low Class Loganathan, but neither film was theatrically released. His last directorial venture Anandha Thollai starring Powerstar Srinivasan is still unreleased.

Death
Anand died of a heart attack in his home town of Kalampalayam.

Filmography

As director

As actor

References

External links
 

Male actors in Tamil cinema
1950s births
2016 deaths
Tamil film directors
Tamil-language film directors
Tamil comedians
20th-century Indian film directors
20th-century Indian male actors
People from Coimbatore
21st-century Indian film directors
Male actors from Tamil Nadu